This is a list of star systems within 50-55 light years of Earth.

See also
 Lists of stars
 List of star systems within 45-50 light-years
 List of star systems within 55-60 light-years
 List of nearest stars and brown dwarfs

References

star systems within 50-55 light-years
Star systems
star systems within 50-55 light-years